Palashipara Mahatma Gandhi Smriti Vidyapith(P.M.G.S.V.) popularly known as Palashipara M.G.S. Vidyapith is one of the old educational institutes of Nadia district, West Bengal. It is situated in Tehatta II block, at Palashipara.

History 
The school was established in 1948 and constructed by the local population with the help of social workers. The infrastructure of school was improved during the 1950s when Mr. Raghunandan Biswas was a Member of the Legislative Assembly and Indian National Congress leader. A two-storied dormitory was constructed for housing student attendees from distant areas that had no higher secondary schools. The building was transferred to the primary school section. The Mahatma Gandhi Smriti Balika Vidyapith (for girls) is situated within a kilometer from this school.

Infrastructure 
This is a boys school and the higher secondary section is co-educational. The curriculum emphasizes science, arts and commerce. There are three laboratories, as well as computer education facilities and a library. The three different sections of education each have their own building: Primary, Madhyamik and Higher Secondary. The school compound contains the teachers' quarters. The school is now under the governance of the West Bengal Board of Secondary Education.

Sports 
The school competes with success in athletics, particularly football, reaching district and state levels. Members of the senior-level football team have participated in the Kolkata super division club and national levels. They have their own playing ground just beside the school.

References 

Schools in Nadia district
High schools and secondary schools in West Bengal
Educational institutions established in 1948
1948 establishments in West Bengal